Guglielmo Trevisan (31 January 1918 – 23 December 2003) was an Italian association football manager and footballer who played as a midfielder. He represented the Italy national football team twice, the first being on 5 May 1940, the occasion of a friendly match against Germany in a 3–2 home win.

References

1918 births
2003 deaths
Italian footballers
Italy international footballers
Association football midfielders
Serie A players
Serie C players
Spezia Calcio players
U.S. Triestina Calcio 1918 players
Genoa C.F.C. players
A.C. Legnano players
Piacenza Calcio 1919 players